Reason is a song by Belgian recording artist Selah Sue. It was written by Sue, Clément Dumoulin, Birsen Uçar, and Robin Hannibal for her same-titled second studio album (2015), while production was helmed by the latter. Distributed by Warner Music Group, it was released as the album's second single by Because Music on February 16, 2015

Charts

Weekly charts

References

External links
SelahSue.com – official website
Lyrics of this song - Reason

2015 songs
2015 singles
Selah Sue songs
Songs written by Robin Hannibal
Because Music singles
Songs written by Selah Sue